Eucalyptus sabulosa, commonly known as Wimmera scentbark, is a species of small, spreading tree that is endemic to Victoria, Australia. It has fibrous or scaly bark on the trunk and branches, lance-shaped to curved adult leaves, flower buds in groups of seven, white flowers and oval to almost spherical fruit.

Description
It has thick, rough, fibrous or scaly bark on the trunk and branches, smooth, salmon-coloured bark on the thin branches. Flowering occurs from March to April and the flowers are white.

Taxonomy and naming
Eucalyptus sabulosa was first formally described in 1996 by Kevin James Rule in the journal Muelleria, from a specimen collected south of Nhill in 1981. The specific epithet (sabulosa) is a Latin word meaning "of the sand", referring to the habitat of this species.

Distribution
This eucalypt occurs in parts of the Grampians and west to Cavendish and the eastern edge of the Little Desert.

See also
List of Eucalyptus species

References

Flora of Victoria (Australia)
Trees of Australia
sabulosa
Myrtales of Australia
Plants described in 1996